Queenstown Secondary School (QTSS) is a co-educational government secondary school in Queenstown, Singapore. QTSS is one of the 28 schools selected by the Ministry of Education to start piloting aspects of Full Subject-Based Banding (Full SBB) from 2020 onwards. This includes reorganised form classes of varying academic abilities (Express, Normal (Academic) and Normal (Technical)).

History

Queenstown Secondary Technical School (1956-1993)
QTSS was established in 1956 as Queenstown Secondary Technical School. Initially, classes were held at the Jalan Eunos English School while the school building was being prepared. In 1957, the school moved to Strathmore Road. Improvements to the building took place in 1963. A pre-university class was added in 1965, which existed until 1994. A new four-storey building was opened in April 1968. The school became co-educational in 1971. New facilities such as basketball courts have been added. In 1985, the school acquired a computer laboratory and language laboratory. Home Economics was also introduced as a subject in 1985

Queenstown Secondary School (1993-Present)
The school was renamed Queenstown Secondary School in January 1993. From December 1993 to June 1997, it occupied temporary premises while the buildings at Strathmore Road were renovated and upgraded.

Identity and culture

School crest
The school crest consists of a shield with the school colours, sky blue and maroon. The sky blue reflects the limitless opportunities to strive for and the maroon signifies the spirit of fraternity. The open book symbolises learning and knowledge, and the wheel symbolises the technical aspect of education offered in the school.

On the tower, which denotes strength, is the lion which signifies courage and from which Singapore derives its name. Below the shield is the school motto "Berani Berkhidmat", which means "Dare To Serve" in Malay.

Discipline
Mobile phones can be brought to school, but will be confiscated if caught being used during lessons or activities. Students must wear fully white socks and canvas shoes. The shirts have to be tucked into the uniform skirt/pants at all times. School ties are to be worn for every Monday's morning assembly.

Notable alumni
 Lee Yock Suan, former Cabinet minister

References

Secondary schools in Singapore
Educational institutions established in 1956
Queenstown, Singapore
Schools in Central Region, Singapore
1956 establishments in Malaya